The Municipality of Šentilj ( or) is a municipality in Slovenia. The seat of the municipality is the town of Šentilj v Slovenskih Goricah. Šentilj became a municipality in 1994.

Settlements
In addition to the municipal seat of Šentilj v Slovenskih Goricah, the municipality also includes the following settlements:

 Ceršak
 Cirknica
 Jurjevski Dol
 Kaniža
 Kozjak pri Ceršaku
 Kresnica
 Plodršnica
 Selnica ob Muri
 Sladki Vrh
 Šomat
 Spodnja Velka
 Srebotje
 Stara Gora pri Šentilju
 Štrihovec
 Svečane
 Trate
 Vranji Vrh
 Zgornja Velka
 Zgornje Dobrenje
 Zgornje Gradišče
 Zgornji Dražen Vrh

References

External links
 
 Municipality of Šentilj on Geopedia
 Municipality of Šentilj website

Sentilj
1994 establishments in Slovenia